Georges Charles Brassens (22 October 1921 – 29 October 1981) was a French singer-songwriter and poet.

As an iconic figure in France, he achieved fame through his elegant songs with their harmonically complex music for voice and guitar and articulate, diverse lyrics. He is considered one of France's most accomplished postwar poets. He has also set to music poems by both well-known and relatively obscure poets, including Louis Aragon, Victor Hugo (La Légende de la Nonne, Gastibelza), Paul Verlaine, Jean Richepin, François Villon (La Ballade des Dames du Temps Jadis), and Antoine Pol (Les Passantes).

During World War II, he was forced by the Germans to work in a labor camp at a BMW aircraft engine plant in Basdorf near Berlin in Germany (March 1943). Here Brassens met some of his future friends, such as Pierre Onténiente, whom he called Gibraltar because he was "steady as a rock." They would later become close friends.

After being given ten days' sick leave in France, he decided not to return to the labor camp. Brassens took refuge in a small cul-de-sac called "Impasse Florimont," in the 14th arrondissement of Paris, a popular district, where he lived for several years with its owner, Jeanne Planche, a friend of his aunt. Planche lived with her husband Marcel in relative poverty: without gas, running water, or electricity. Brassens remained hidden there until the end of the war five months later, but ended up staying for 22 years. Planche was the inspiration for Brassens's song Jeanne.

He wrote and sang, with his guitar, more than a hundred of his poems. Between 1952 and 1976, he recorded fourteen albums that include several popular French songs such as Les copains d'abord, Chanson pour l'Auvergnat, La mauvaise réputation, and Mourir pour des idées. Most of his texts are tinged with black humour and are often anarchist-minded.

In 1967, he received the Grand Prix de Poésie of the Académie française.

Apart from Paris and Sète, he lived in Crespières (near Paris) and in Lézardrieux (Brittany).

Biography

Childhood and education 
Brassens was born in Sète, a commune in the Hérault department of the Occitanie region, to a French father and an Italian mother from the town of Marsico Nuovo (in the province of Potenza, Basilicata).

Brassens grew up in the family home in Sète with his mother, Elvira Dagrosa, father, Jean-Louis, half-sister, Simone (daughter of Elvira and her first husband, who was killed in World War I), and paternal grandfather, Jules. His mother, whom Brassens labeled a "missionary for songs" (militante de la chanson), came from southern Italy (Marsico Nuovo in Basilicata), had a love for music. His mother, Simone, was always singing.

Wartime

Exile
In March 1943, Brassens was requisitioned for the STO (Service du travail obligatoire) forced labour organisation in Germany. He found time to write Bonhomme and Pauvre Martin, along with more than a hundred other songs, that were later either burned or frequently altered before they reached their final form (Le Mauvais sujet repenti). He also wrote the beginning of his first novel, Lalie Kakamou. In Germany, he met some of his best friends like Pierre Onténiente, whom he nicknamed "Gibraltar", because he was "firm as a rock." Onténiente later became his right-hand man and his private secretary.      

A year after he arrived in Basdorf, Brassens was granted a ten-day furlough. It was obvious to him and his new friends that he wouldn't come back. In Paris, he had to find a hideout, but he knew very few people. Finally, Jeanne Planche came to his aid and offered to put him up as long as necessary. Jeanne lived with her husband Marcel in a hovel at 9 impasse Florimont, with no gas, water or electricity. Brassens accepted and stayed there for twenty-two years. He once said on the radio: "It was nice there, and I have gained since then quite an amazing sense of discomfort." According to Pierre Onténiente: "Jeanne had a crush on Georges, and Marcel knew nothing, as he started to get drunk at eight in the morning."

Anarchist influences

Once put up at Jeanne Planche's, Georges had to stay hidden for five months, waiting for the war to come to an end. He continued writing poems and songs. He composed using as his only instrument a small piece of furniture that he called "my drum" on which he beat out the rhythm. He resumed writing the novel he started in Basdorf, for only now did he consider a career as a famous novelist. The end of World War II and the freedom suddenly regained didn't change his habits much, except that he got his library card back and resumed studying poetry.

The end of the war meant the homecoming of the friends from Basdorf, with whom Brassens planned to create an anarchist-minded paper, Le Cri des Gueux (The villains' cry), which stopped after the first edition due to a lack of money. At the same time, he set up the "Prehistoric Party" with Emile Miramont (a friend from Sète nicknamed "Corne d'Auroch" – the horn of an Aurochs, an ancient large bovine species) and André Larue (whom he met in Basdorf), which advocated the return to a more modest way of life, but whose chief purpose was to ridicule the other political parties. After the failure of Le Cri des Gueux, Brassens joined the Anarchist Federation and wrote some virulent, black humour-tinged articles for Le Libertaire, the Federation's paper. But the extravagance of the future songwriter wasn't to everybody's taste, and he soon had to leave the Federation, albeit without resentment.

Brassens said in an interview: "An anarchist is a man who scrupulously crosses at the zebra crossing, because he hates to argue with the agents". He also said: "I'm not very fond of the law. As Léautaud would say, I could do without laws [...] I think most people couldn’t."

Career
His friends who heard and liked his songs urged him to go and try them out in a cabaret, café or concert hall. He was shy and had difficulty performing in front of people. At first, he wanted to sell his songs to well-known singers such as Les Frères Jacques. The owner of a cafe told him that his songs were not the type he was looking for. But at one point he met the singer Patachou in a very well-known cafe, Les Trois Baudets, and she brought him into the music scene. Several famous singers came into the music industry this way, including Jacques Brel and Léo Ferré. He later on made several appearances at the Paris Olympia under Bruno Coquatrix' management and at the Bobino music hall theater.

He toured with Pierre Louki, who wrote a book of recollections entitled Avec Brassens (éditions Christian Pirot, 1999). After 1952, Brassens rarely left France. A few trips to Belgium and Switzerland; a month in Canada (1961, recording issued on CD in 2011) and another in North Africa were his only trips outside France – except for his concerts in Wales in 1970 and 1973 (Cardiff). His concert at Cardiff's Sherman Theatre in 1973 saw Jake Thackray — a great admirer of his work – open for him.

Songs

Brassens accompanied himself on acoustic guitar. Most of the time the only other accompaniment came from his friend Pierre Nicolas with a double bass, and sometimes a second guitar (Barthélémy Rosso).

His songs often decry hypocrisy and self-righteousness in the conservative French society of the time, especially among the religious, the well-to-do, and those in law enforcement.  The criticism is often indirect, focusing on the good deeds or innocence of others in contrast.  His elegant use of florid language and dark humor, along with bouncy rhythms, often give a rather jocular feel to even the grimmest lyrics.

Some of his most famous songs include:
 "Les copains d'abord," about a boat of that name, and friendship, written for a movie Les copains (1964) directed by Yves Robert; (translated and covered by Asleep at the Wheel as "Friendship First" and by a Polish cover band  as "Kumple to grunt" and included on their 2007 eponymously titled CD).
 "Chanson pour l'Auvergnat," lauding those who take care of the downtrodden against the pettiness of the bourgeois and the harshness of law enforcement.
 "Brave Margot," about a young girl who gives a young kitten the breast, which attracts a large group of male onlookers.
 "La Cane de Jeanne," for Marcel and Jeanne Planche, who befriended and sheltered him and others.
 "La mauvaise réputation" – "the bad reputation" – a semi-autobiographical tune with its catchy lyric: "Mais les braves gens n'aiment pas que l'on suive une autre route qu'eux" (But the good folks don't like it if you take a different road than they do.) Pierre Pascal adapted part of the lyrics to Spanish under the title "La mala reputación", which was later interpreted by Paco Ibañez.
 "Les amoureux des bancs publics" – about young lovers who kiss each other publicly and shock self-righteous people.
 "Pauvre Martin," the suffering of a poor peasant.
 "Le Gorille" – tells, in a humorous fashion, of a gorilla with a large penis (and admired for this by ladies) who escapes his cage. Mistaking a robed judge for a woman, the beast forcefully sodomizes him. The song contrasts the wooden attitude that the judge had exhibited when sentencing a man to death by the guillotine with his cries for mercy when being assaulted by the gorilla. This song, considered pornographic, was banned for a while. The song's refrain (Gare au gori – i – i – i – ille, "beware the gorilla") is widely known; it was translated into English by Jake Thackray as Brother Gorilla, by Greek singer-songwriter Christos Thivaios as Ο Γορίλλας ("The Gorilla"), by Spanish songwriter Joaquín Carbonell as "El Gorila" ("The Gorilla"), by Italian songwriter Fabrizio De André as "Il Gorilla" ("The Gorilla" – De André included this translation into his 1968 album "Volume III"), by the Polish cover band Zespół Reprezentacyjny as "Goryl" and by Israeli writer Dan Almagor as "הגורילה".
 "Fernande" – a 'virile antiphon' about the women lonely men think about to inspire self-gratification (or to nip it in the bud).  Its infamous refrain (Quand je pense à Fernande, je bande, je bande..., 'When I think about Fernande, I get hard') is still immediately recognized in France, and has essentially ended the use of several female first names.
 "Supplique pour être enterré à la plage de Sète" , a long song (7:18) describing, in a colourful, "live" and poetic way, his wish to be buried on a particular sandy beach in his hometown, "Plage de la Corniche".
 "Mourir pour des idées," describing the recurring violence over ideas and an exhortation to be left in peace (translated into Italian by Italian singer-songwriter Fabrizio De André as "Morire per delle idee" and included in De André's 1974 album Canzoni and by the Polish cover band Zespół Reprezentacyjny as "Śmierć za idee" and included on their 2007 CD Kumple to grunt).

Death 

Legacy
Many artists from Japan, Israel, Russia, the United States (where there is a Georges Brassens fan club), Italy and Spain have made cover versions of Brassens's songs. His songs have been translated into 20 languages, including Esperanto.

Dieter Kaiser, a Belgian-German singer who performs in public concerts with the French-German professional guitarist Stéphane Bazire under the name Stéphane & Didier has translated into German language and gathered in a brochure 19 Brassens songs. He also translated among others the poem "Il n'y a pas d'amour heureux" of the French contemporary poet Louis Aragon. Franco-Cameroonian singer Kristo Numpuby also released a cover-album with the original French lyrics but adapted the songs to various African rhythms.

An international association of Georges Brassens fans exists and there is also a fan club in Berlin-Basdorf which organizes a Brassens festival every year in September.

Brassens composed about 250 songs, of which 200 were recorded, the other 50 remaining unfinished.

Renée Claude, an important Québécois singer, dedicated a tribute-album to him, J'ai rendez-vous avec vous (1993).

Le Dîner de Cons, 1998's top-grossing film in France, used Brassens' song "Le Temps Ne Fait Rien a l'Affaire" as its opening title music.

His songs have a major influence on many French singers across several generations, including Maxime Le Forestier, Renaud, Bénabar and others.

In 2008, the English folk-singer Leon Rosselson included a tribute song to Brassens, entitled "The Ghost of Georges Brassens", on his album A Proper State.

The song "À Brassens" ("To Brassens") from Jean Ferrat's album Ferrat was dedicated to Brassens.

In 2014, Australian-French duo Mountain Men released a live tribute album Mountain Men chante Georges Brassens.

"6587 Brassens" is an asteroid discovered in 1984 and named in honour of the French poet and songwriter.

Heritage sites
Many schools, theatres, parks, public gardens, and public places are dedicated to Georges Brassens and his work, including:

 L'Espace Brassens in his hometown of Sète, a museum to his life.
 A park built on the site of the former Vaugirard horse market & slaughterhouses, was named Parc Georges-Brassens. Brassens lived a large part of his life about hundred metres from the slaughterhouses, at 9, impasse Florimont and then at 42, rue Santos-Dumont. The park was inaugurated in 1975.
 A nearby station of Tram line 3 in Paris is also named in Brassens' honour.
 The Place du Marché of Brive-la-Gaillarde was renamed Place Georges-Brassens as a tribute to his well-known song Hécatombe, which name-drops the market.
 In the Paris Métro station Porte des Lilas (Line 11) there is a mural portrait of Brassens along with a quote from his song "Les Lilas", written for the 1957 film Porte des Lilas by René Clair. In this film, Brassens had a supporting role, practically playing himself.

Discography

All of Georges Brassens' studio albums are untitled. They are referred either as self-titled with a number, or by the title of the first song on the album, or by the most well-known song.

Studio albums 
 1952: La Mauvaise Réputation
 1953: Le Vent (or Les Amoureux des bancs publics)
 including Pauvre Martin
 1954: Les Sabots d'Hélène (or Chanson pour l'Auvergnat)
 1956: Je me suis fait tout petit
 1957: Oncle Archibald
 1958: Le Pornographe
 1960: Les Funérailles d'antan (or Le Mécréant)
 1961: Le Temps ne fait rien à l'affaire
 1962: Les Trompettes de la renommée
 1964: Les Copains d'abord
 1966: Supplique pour être enterré à la plage de Sète
 1969: Misogynie à part (or La Religieuse)
 1972: Fernande
 1976: Trompe la mort (or Nouvelles chansons)
 1979: Brassens-Moustache jouent Brassens en jazz (with Moustache and les Petits français, jazz versions of previously released songs; re-released in 1989 as Giants of Jazz Play Brassens)
 1982: Georges Brassens chante les chansons de sa jeunesse (cover album of old songs)

Live albums
 1973: Georges Brassens in Great Britain
 1996: Georges Brassens au TNP (recorded in 1966)
 2001: Georges Brassens à la Villa d'Este (recorded in 1953)
 2001: Bobino 64
 2006: Concerts de 1959 à 1976 (box set featuring concerts from 1960, 1969, 1970, 1973 and 1976)

References

External links
 
  Espace Brassens museum in Sète 
  Georges-Brassens.com
 
  Georges Brassens Page from the Daily Bleed's Anarchist Encyclopedia
  Project Brassens Brassens's complete production with English and Italian translations. Toutes les chansons de Georges Brassens avec les traductions des textes en anglais et italien - Tutte le canzoni di Georges Brassens con i testi tradotti in inglese e italiano. 

1921 births
1981 deaths
People from Sète
French male guitarists
French  male  singer-songwriters
French people of Italian descent
French anarchists
French satirists
20th-century French poets
Members of the French Anarchist Federation
20th-century guitarists
20th-century French male singers
French World War II forced labourers